Air Vice-Marshal Simon S. Edwards is a senior officer in the Royal Air Force, currently serving as Assistant Chief of the Air Staff.

Education
Edwards attended Joint Services Command and Staff College and received a master's degree in Defence Studies. In 2017 he graduated from the Royal College of Defence Studies and won the Bon Oeuf trophy.

RAF career
Edwards joined the Royal Air Force in 1990. He was promoted to squadron leader in 2001 and was posted to Air Command. Edwards flew C17s for No. 99 Squadron RAF. In 2005 he was promoted to wing commander. He worked for the Ministry of Defence in 2006. He was then chosen to return No. 99 Squadron RAF and became the commanding officer of the squadron.

Edwards was promoted to air commodore and appointed Assistant Chief of Staff Capability Delivery, Air Mobility & Air Enablers, Headquarters Air Command in July 2018.  In May 2021, he was promoted to air vice-marshal and became Assistant Chief of the Air Staff, replacing Air Marshal Ian Gale.

References

Year of birth missing (living people)
Living people
Graduates of the Royal College of Defence Studies
Royal Air Force officers
Royal Air Force air marshals
20th-century Royal Air Force personnel
21st-century Royal Air Force personnel